Razeh Band (also Romanized as Rezehband; also known as Razaband and Razeband) is a village in Dast Jerdeh Rural District, Chavarzaq District, Tarom County, Zanjan Province, Iran. At the 2006 census, its population was 583, in 145 families.

References 

Populated places in Tarom County